was the daimyō of Bizen and Mimasaka Provinces (modern Okayama Prefecture), and one of the council of Five Elders appointed by Toyotomi Hideyoshi.  Son of Ukita Naoie, he married Gōhime, a daughter of Maeda Toshiie.  Having fought against Tokugawa Ieyasu in the Battle of Sekigahara he was exiled to the island prison of Hachijō-jima, where he died.

Biography
Hideie's father Ukita Naoie was daimyō of Bizen province and initially opposed, but later sided with Oda Nobunaga and Toyotomi Hideyoshi. Naoie died in 1581, and Hideie became the head of the Ukita clan. As Hideie was still young (10 years old), it was Hideie's uncle (Ukita Tadaie) who acted as leader of the Ukita army until Hideie coming of age, in particular, Tadaie served on behalf of Hideie as a commander in numerous battles (under Toyotomi Hideyoshi). However, during the siege of Bitchū Takamatsu Castle in 1582, Nobunaga was assassinated on June 2 of that year, but the siege continued until the castle fell two days later. Hideyoshi raced back to Kyoto, leaving the Ukita clan in charge of Bizen, Mimasaka and newly taken parts of Bitchū Province. The Ukita were also to keep watch on Mōri Terumoto to the west.

In 1585, Hideie's forces under Ukita Tadaie led 23,000 men Toyotomi's forces in the Shikoku campaign against Chosokabe Motochika.

In 1586, Hideie was married to Hideyoshi's adopted daughter, Gōhime. (She had been adopted by Hideyoshi from Maeda Toshiie). 
Later, He participated in the Kyushu Conquest in 1587.

In 1590, Hideie joined Hideyoshi's military campaigns in the Odawara campaign against Hōjō Ujimasa. 

Following the unification of Japan under Hideyoshi, in 1592, he command "Reserves Division" at First Korean campaigns. 

Later in 1597, Hideie became a "Chief Commander" in the Second Korean campaigns, returning in 1598 to serve as one of Hideyoshi's five counselors (Council of Five Elders) along with Maeda Toshiie, Uesugi Kagekatsu, Mōri Terumoto, and Tokugawa Ieyasu.

Battle of Sekigahara

After Hideyoshi died in 1598, leaving his five-year-old son Hideyori as his successor and Tokugawa Ieyasu moved to take control. As he was very close to Hideyoshi, Ukita naturally sided with the Toyotomi loyalists under Ishida Mitsunari (the Western army). He took  17,000 men to fight in the Battle of Sekigahara. In the field, his army fought against Fukushima Masanori, what is said to have been one of the bloodiest confrontations in the Sekigahara battle. Ukita's troops were winning the battle, pushing back Masanori's army, however, being unaware that his allies stationed nearby had made a secret deal with the enemy, his momentum was halted, when his allies attacked and together with turncoats. Later, Masanori's army took control of, and eastern army won the battle.  

One of the defectors, Kobayakawa Hideaki, was granted Okayama Castle and surrounding Ukita territories by the Tokugawa as a reward for his betrayal, which is believed to have been the decisive factor in the Tokugawa victory. 
Hideie was angered by the betrayal and initially intended to hunt down Kobayakawa for a man-to-man duel but was stopped by his advisors. After escaping the battle, he went into hiding in Satsuma Province where his former allies protected him for several years.

Exile
In 1603 however, Shimazu Tadatsune informed the Tokugawa shogunate of Hideie's location. Tadatsune and Hideie's relative Maeda Toshinaga, however, negotiate with Ieyasu and he escaped the death penalty, and he was confined in Mt. Kuno in Suruga Province instead. Later, he was forced to appear before Tokugawa himself where he was sentenced to exile on the island of Hachijō-jima, along with several supporters, including his two sons. Hideie's wife sought refuge with the Maeda clan and was able to correspond and send gifts (rice, sake, clothing) to her husband and sons from there.

Hideie eventually outlived his wife and all of the Sengoku Jidai era samurai except Sanada Nobuyuki. He was offered a conditional pardon after Ieyasu's death, but declined and never returned to the mainland.  His wife had died, the Toyotomi were defeated, there was no place to return to, his sons had fathered children on Hachijojima, and the Shogunate was to be inherited by members of the Tokugawa clan.

There is no evidence to suggest that Hideie fathered any further children himself, but many of his sons' descendants emigrated back to the Japanese mainland when a full pardon was granted at the end of the Edo era.

Notes

References
 Kodansha. (1983). "Ukita Hideie," in Kodansha Encyclopedia of Japan. Tokyo: Kodansha. OCLC 233144013

External links 

 Okayama City's page on Hideie 

1570s births
1655 deaths
Daimyo
Tairō
Ukita clan
Toyotomi retainers
People from Okayama Prefecture